is a Japanese table tennis player.

Kenji is the second of four children. His siblings, including younger brother Kenta, are all professional table tennis players.

Achievements

ITTF Tours
Men's doubles

References

1989 births
Living people
Japanese male table tennis players
Sportspeople from Ishikawa Prefecture
People from Nanao, Ishikawa
Aomori University alumni
Universiade medalists in table tennis
Universiade silver medalists for Japan
Universiade bronze medalists for Japan
Japanese expatriate sportspeople in France
Medalists at the 2009 Summer Universiade
Medalists at the 2011 Summer Universiade
21st-century Japanese people